Angel Bozhidarov Yoshev (born 1 January 1985) is a Bulgarian footballer, currently playing as a defender for Marek Dupnitsa. Yoshev is a left back.

References

External links

1985 births
Living people
Bulgarian footballers
First Professional Football League (Bulgaria) players
PFC CSKA Sofia players
PFC Lokomotiv Plovdiv players
PFC Minyor Pernik players
Ħamrun Spartans F.C. players
PFC Svetkavitsa players
Neftochimic Burgas players
PFC Marek Dupnitsa players
Expatriate footballers in Malta
Association football defenders
Bulgarian expatriates in Malta